Friesz is a surname. Notable people with the surname include:

John Friesz (born 1967), American football player
Lance Friesz (born 1983), American soccer player
Othon Friesz (1879–1949), French artist
Terry Friesz, American professor

See also
Fries (surname)
Friess
Ethnonymic surnames